Batts House and Outbuildings is a historic home and associated outbuildings located near Tarboro, Edgecombe County, North Carolina. The dwelling dates to about 1880, and is a two-story frame Italianate-style house. Also on the property are the contributing one-story frame doctor's office (c. 1880), a small dairy (c. 1880), a log smokehouse and wood shed (c. 1810), a dilapidated corn barn (c. 1810), and a carriage house, later converted to a garage (1912). Also on the property is a family cemetery (c. 1808–1885).

It was listed on the National Register of Historic Places in 2006.

References

Houses on the National Register of Historic Places in North Carolina
Italianate architecture in North Carolina
Houses completed in 1880
Houses in Edgecombe County, North Carolina
National Register of Historic Places in Edgecombe County, North Carolina